Jaanimäe may refer to:
Jaanimäe, Rõuge Parish, Estonia
Jaanimäe, Setomaa Parish, Estonia